The Delaware Department of Correction is a state agency of Delaware that manages state prisons. It has its headquarters in the Central Administration Building in Dover. At one time the headquarters was located in Smyrna.

Prisons

 Delores J. Baylor Women's Correctional Institution  (inmate capacity 320)
 Howard R. Young Correctional Institution (capacity 1,500)
 James T. Vaughn Correctional Center (formerly Delaware Correctional Center) (capacity 2,600)
 Sussex Correctional Institution (capacity 1,206)

Community Corrections 

 Central Violation of Probation Center
 Hazel D. Plant Women's Treatment Facility
 John L. Webb Correctional Facility
 Morris Community Corrections Center
 Plummer Community Corrections Center
 Probation and Parole / Day Reporting Centers
 Sussex Community Corrections Center
 Sussex Violation of Probation
 Sussex Work Release Center

Operations
60% of all admissions into the Delaware correctional system go to the Howard R. Young Correctional Institution, and that facility houses the majority of Delaware's detainee population.

The male death row is in the James T. Vaughn Correctional Center (JTVCC), while the female death row is in Delores J. Baylor Women's Correctional Institution. Executions occur at JTVCC, as it houses the execution chamber.

See also
 List of law enforcement agencies in Delaware
 List of United States state correction agencies
List of U.S. state prisons
 Prison

References

External links
Delaware Department of Correction
Delaware Department of Correction Featured Careers

State law enforcement agencies of Delaware
State corrections departments of the United States
 
Lists of United States state prisons